Skaget is a mountain in Øystre Slidre Municipality in Innlandet county, Norway.

See also
List of mountains of Norway by height

References

Øystre Slidre
Mountains of Innlandet